Wizz Air Ukraine was the Ukrainian division of the Hungarian counterpart Wizz Air based at Kyiv Zhuliany International Airport with additional minor operations out of Lviv Danylo Halytskyi International Airport. It ceased operations by 20 April 2015.

History
Wizz Air Ukraine commenced domestic operations in Ukraine on 11 July 2008 and later added international flights. Domestic operations were later discontinued.

In October 2013, the airline opened its second base at Donetsk International Airport by deploying one aircraft and opening six new routes. However, the Donetsk base was closed by April 2014 due to the War in Donbas.

On 26 March 2015, it was announced that Wizz Air Ukraine would shut down by 20 April 2015 due to the crisis in Ukraine. Eight routes from Kyiv - half of them to Germany - were taken over by the parent company, Wizz Air, while the remaining ten routes from Kyiv and Lviv to destinations in Italy, Spain, Russia and Georgia currently operated by Wizz Air Ukraine ceased entirely. All of Wizz Air Ukraine's Airbus A320-200s were taken over by Wizz Air Hungary.

In November 2018, it was reported that Wizz Air had announced plans to reactivate its Wizz Air Ukraine subsidiary, approximately three years after it was shut down. Under the plan, Wizz Air Ukraine will seek to complete certification in 2019 following the acquisition of twenty A320/321 neo jets. Bases will be developed in Kyiv as well as other cities across the country. By 2025, it aims to have a passenger throughput of 6 million passengers per annum.

Destinations

Prior to its shutdown, Wizz Air Ukraine operated 18 routes from Kyiv and Lviv to international destinations in several countries, focusing on Germany and Italy.

Fleet

The Wizz Air Ukraine fleet consisted of the following aircraft as of April 2015:

References

External links

Official website

Defunct airlines of Ukraine
Airlines established in 2008
Airlines disestablished in 2015
Ukrainian companies established in 2008